Crinum latifolium is a herbaceous perennial flowering plant in the amaryllis family (Amaryllidaceae).  It arises from an underground bulb. The flowering stems are stout, reaching about 2 m in height. The leaves are long, linear and ligulate. The flowers are white and arranged in an umbel. It grows naturally in Asia, from India and Sri Lanka through much of mainland Southeast Asia to south China (Guangxi, Guizhou, Yunnan). It is also reportedly naturalized in the West Indies and in the Chagos Archipelago.

References

External links
photo of herbarium specimen at Missouri Botanical Garden, Crinum latifolium, collected in Sri Lanka
line drawing of Crinum latifolium, Flora of China Illustrations vol. 24, fig. 302, 3

latifolium
Flora of South-Central China
Flora of Southeast China
Flora of the Indian subcontinent
Flora of Indo-China
Plants described in 1753
Taxa named by Carl Linnaeus